Bato (IPA: [bɐ'to]), officially the Municipality of Bato, is a 4th class municipality in the province of Leyte, Philippines. According to the 2020 census, it has a population of 38,505 people.

It borders with the municipality of Matalom in the south, Hilongos in the north, and Bontoc to the east. Bato, together with Hilongos, is also a center of commerce, trade and education in southwestern part of Leyte.

Geography

Barangays
Bato is politically subdivided into 32 barangays.

Climate

Demographics

Economy

Transportation

Shipping companies operating in Bato
 Medallion Transport: day & night trips to Cebu City and vice versa
 Medallion Transport: day & night trips to Ubay, Bohol and vice versa
Southern Pacific Shipping: night trips to Cebu City and vice versa
& Local MBCAs or Motor Bancas (Cebuano: Pambot) which serves day trips to Ubay, Bohol and vice versa; also, to the Island-Barangay of Dawahon and vice versa.

Transit Bus Companies
 Super 5
 CUL Transport
 Mega Bus
 DLTB
 Ultrabus
 Philtranco

Education

Tertiary education

 Bato Institute of Science and Technology, Inc.

Secondary education

(PUBLIC)

 Bato School of Fisheries
 Bato National High School
 Dawahon National High School
 Anahawan National High School
 Buli National High School

(PRIVATE)

 Bato Institute Of Science and Technology Inc. (High School Department)
 Bato Academy

Elementary education

(PUBLIC)

EAST DISTRICT

 Anahawan Central School (Barangay Anahawan)
 Alejos Elementary School
 Tagaytay Elementary School
 Naga Elementary School
 Mabini Elementary School
 Bago Elementary School
 Himama-a Elementary School
 Liberty Elementary School
 Katipunan Elementary School
 Revilla Primary School
 Cebuana Primary School
 Plaridel Elementary School
 Osmena Elementary School
 Buli Elementary School
 Talisayan Primary School
 Imelda Elementary School

WEST DISTRICT

 Bato Central School (Brgys. Tinago and Kalanggaman)
 Dolho Elementary School
 Dawahon Elementary School
 Ponong Elementary School
 Tabunok Elementary School
 Tugas Elementary School
 Alegria Elementary School
 Amagos Elementary School
 Marcelo Elementary School
 Domagocdoc Primary School

(PRIVATE)

 Saint Teresa's School of Bato, Inc.
 Bato Institute of Science and Technology, Inc. (Elementary Department)

References

External links
Official Website of Bato
 [ Philippine Standard Geographic Code]
Philippine Census Information
Local Governance Performance Management System

Municipalities of Leyte (province)